Chikuma City Togura Gymnasium is an arena in Chikuma, Nagano, Japan. It is the former home arena of the Shinshu Brave Warriors of the B.League, Japan's professional basketball league.  Warriors also play at the Matsumoto City Gymnasium, White Ring and Big Hat in the prefecture.

References

Basketball venues in Japan
Chikuma, Nagano
Indoor arenas in Japan
Shinshu Brave Warriors
Sports venues in Nagano Prefecture